Livingston Chester Lord (August 27, 1851 – May 15, 1933) was the second president of Eastern Illinois University, serving from 1898 to 1933.

Life before Eastern 
Lord was born in Killingworth, Connecticut.  He was the first son of Benjamin and Antoinette Case Lord.  He completed his education at the Normal School in New Britain, Connecticut.  Lord began teaching in 1871 as the principal of the Terryville, Connecticut high school.  He married Mary E. Cook in 1873.  The couple moved to Minnesota in 1874 where Lord taught for 24 years.  He served as the first president of the Normal School at Moorhead, Minnesota during this time. Present day Minnesota State University Moorhead has named its library--the Livingston Lord Library after him.

References 
Coleman, Charles H.  Eastern Illinois State College, Fifty Years of Public Service.  Charleston, Ill. 1948.

Comstock, Ada Louise. Dedication of the Livingston C. Lord Library. Manuscript. 1961.

Glasrud, Clarence A. The Moorhead Normal School. Moorhead, Minn.: Moorhead State University, 1987.

McKinney, Isabel. Mr. Lord: The Life and Words of Livingston C. Lord. Urbana, Ill.: University of Illinois Press, 1937.

MSUM Memories 1888-2013: Reflections of the College and the University. Moorhead, Minnesota: Office of Marketing and Communications, Minnesota State University Moorhead, 2013.

External links 
 Livingston C. Lord at EIU Archives 
 Eastern Illinois University 
 EIU on Wikipedia Eastern Illinois University

1851 births
1933 deaths
Presidents of Eastern Illinois University
People from Killingworth, Connecticut